Cheyenne McCray (born 1965 in Miami, Arizona, US) is an American author of romance novels, including paranormal romance, erotic romantic, romantic suspense, and urban fantasy. She has written multiple novels published by St. Martin’s Press and self-published e-books and paperbacks. Her work has also been featured in "USA Today" for her novels and in The New York Times bestselling anthologies.

Bibliography

Published by St. Martin’s Press

Night Tracker novels
 Demons Not Included, 2009
 No Werewolves Allowed, 2010
 Vampires Not Invited, 2010
 Zombies Sold Separately, 2011
 Vampires Dead Ahead, 2011

Lexi Steele novels
 The First Sin, 2009
 The Second Betrayal, 2009
 The Temptation, 2012

Magic series
 Forbidden Magic, 2005
 Seduced by Magic, 2006
 Wicked Magic, 2007
 "Breath of Magic", 2007
 Shadow Magic, 2008
 Dark Magic, 2008

Romantic suspense
 Chosen Prey, 2007
 Moving Target, 2008

Armed & Dangerous
 Zack, 2008
 Luke, 2009
 Kade, 2010
 Clay, 2011

Self-published work

Lawmen series
 Hidden Prey, 2014
 No Mercy, 2015
 Slow Burn, 2015
 Point Blank, 2015

Riding Tall series
 Branded For You, 2012
 Roping Your Heart, 2012
 Fencing You In, 2012
 Tying You Down, 2013
 Playing With You, 2013
 Hot For You, 2013
 Crazy For You, 2013
 Made For You, 2013
 Held By You, 2014
 Belong To You, 2014

Rough & Ready series
 Lipstick & Leather, 2011
 Silk & Spurs, 2011
 Lace & Lassos, 2012
 Champagne & Chaps, 2012
 Satin & Saddles, 2012
 "Roses & Rodeo", 2012
 "Lingerie & Lariats", 2012
 "Country Thunder", 2020

Altered States
 Dark Seduction, 2012

Work in anthologies
 "Breath of Magic," No Rest for the Witches, St. Martin’s Press, 2007
 "Demon Lover," Hotter Than Hell, edited by Kim Harrison, Harper, 2008
 "The Edge of Sin," Real Men Last All Night, St. Martin’s Press, 2009
 "Succubus Seduction," Mammoth Book of Paranormal Romance, edited by Trisha Telep, Running Press, 2009
 "Dark Force," Mammoth Book of Special Ops Romance, edited by Trisha Telep, Running Press, 2010
 "Double Dead," Chicks Kick Butt, Tom Doherty Associates, 2011
 "Deadly Dance," Legally Hot, St. Martin’s Press, 2012

References

External links

Living people
21st-century American novelists
American romantic fiction writers
American women novelists
Novelists from Arizona
1965 births
Women romantic fiction writers
21st-century American women writers